Anarestan (also Romanized as Ānārestān; also known as Ānārsen) is a village in Kashkan Rural District, Shahivand District, Dowreh County, Lorestan Province, Iran. At the 2006 census, its population was 73, in 16 families.

References 

Towns and villages in Dowreh County